Odagiri (written:  or ) is a Japanese surname. Notable people with the surname include:

, Japanese actor and musician
, Japanese boxer
, better known as Yuu Kashii, Japanese actress and model

Fictional characters
, a character in the tokusatsu television series Chōjin Sentai Jetman
, a character in the manga series Sansha San'yō

See also
Otagiri Dam, a dam in Nagano Prefecture, Japan

Japanese-language surnames